The Artesia Dodgers was the primary moniker of the minor league baseball team in Artesia, New Mexico that played from 1951-1955 and 1958-1961 as an affiliate of the San Francisco Giants and Los Angeles Dodgers.

History
The Artesia Drillers (1951-1953) and later the Artesia Numexers(1954-1955) first began play in Artesia as members of the Longhorn League from 1951-1955.

They were later an affiliate of the Los Angeles Dodgers during final season of existence in 1961. They finished 48-78 in the Sophomore League under manager Spider Jorgensen. Before becoming the Dodgers, they were a San Francisco Giants affiliate known as the Artesia Giants from 1958-1960.

The 1954 Numexers were Longhorn League Champions after finishing 92-46 in the regular season. The team moniker was a combination of "New" and "Mexico."

The 1958 team finished 63-57, losing in the league Finals.

The ballpark

Artesia teams played at Brainard Park on 13th Street. The ballpark is still in use today, known as Brainard Baseball Field, home to Artesia High School teams. The ballpark is located at 1102 North 13th Street, Artesia, NM 88210

Notable alumni
 Jesus Alou (1960)
 Dick Dietz (1960) MLB All-Star
 Clarence Jones (1961)

References

External links
Baseball Reference

Defunct minor league baseball teams
Los Angeles Dodgers minor league affiliates
Professional baseball teams in New Mexico
San Francisco Giants minor league affiliates
Baseball teams established in 1951
Baseball teams disestablished in 1961
1951 establishments in New Mexico
1961 disestablishments in New Mexico
Eddy County, New Mexico
Defunct baseball teams in New Mexico
Longhorn League teams